The 1973 German Grand Prix was a Formula One motor race held at Nürburgring on 5 August 1973. It was race 11 of 15 in both the 1973 World Championship of Drivers and the 1973 International Cup for Formula One Manufacturers.

The 14-lap race was won from pole position by Jackie Stewart, driving a Tyrrell-Ford. It was Stewart's 27th and final Grand Prix victory, a record that would stand until . Teammate François Cevert finished second, with Jacky Ickx third in a McLaren-Ford.

Ferrari did not participate in this race due to internal political issues and the uncompetitiveness of their car, enabling regular Ferrari driver and Nürburgring specialist Ickx to accept a one-off drive for McLaren.

The works March team also did not participate in this race following the accident at the Dutch Grand Prix the previous weekend that had claimed the life of Roger Williamson. The Ensign, Tecno and Hesketh teams also did not participate. To boost the field, the McLaren, Brabham and Surtees teams all entered three cars: Ferrari released Ickx to drive the third McLaren; Rolf Stommelen drove the third Brabham in place of the injured Andrea de Adamich; and Jochen Mass drove the third Surtees. 

Niki Lauda, who out-qualified his teammates by more than 8 seconds crashed at Kesselchen on Lap 2 and injured his wrist; he had to miss the subsequent race, the Austrian Grand Prix, which was his home race.

The race was rebroadcast in 2003 in the USA on Speed Channel as a special broadcast of their Formula 1 retrospective, Formula One Decade. Commentary was by Jackie Stewart and David Hobbs.

Qualifying

Qualifying classification

Race

Classification

Championship standings after the race

Drivers' Championship standings

Constructors' Championship standings

References

German Grand Prix
German Grand Prix
German Grand Prix
Sport in Rhineland-Palatinate